Rabbi Moses Sebulun Margolies (April 1851 – August 25, 1936) was a Russian-born American Orthodox rabbi, who served as senior rabbi of Congregation Kehilath Jeshurun on the Upper East Side of the New York City borough of Manhattan. In its obituary, The New York Times described Rabbi Margolies as the "dean of orthodox rabbis in North America," a "Zionist leader and Jewish educator."

Margolies was born in Kroza, Russian Empire (now Kražiai, Lithuania) in April 1851 and received his rabbinical training at the yeshivas in Kroza and Białystok. He received semicha from Rabbi Yomtov Lipman Heilpern, the Oneg Yom Tov.  He became the rabbi of Sloboda at age 26, serving there until he was summoned to Boston in 1889 to serve as the chief rabbi for that city's Orthodox Jewish community. He came to New York City in 1906 to serve as rabbi of Congregation Kehilath Jeshurun, described by The New York Times as "one of the largest and most influential Orthodox congregations in the country."

As part of the anti-Nazi Boycott of 1933, Rabbi Margolies rose from his sickbed to address the overflow crowd at Madison Square Garden on March 27, 1933, bringing the crowd of 20,000 to its feet with his prayers that the antisemitic persecution cease and that the hearts of Israel's enemies should be softened.

Rabbi Margolies died at age 85 on August 25, 1936 at the Carlton Hotel in Belmar, New Jersey, with his wife, son and daughter at his bedside. He had been stricken with pneumonia a week before his death. Funeral ceremonies were to be held the following day at Congregation Kehilath Jeshurun.

His grandson-in-law, Rabbi Joseph Lookstein, had served as assistant rabbi at the congregation since receiving his rabbinical ordination in 1926, and had filled in for Margolies during his prolonged illness. Rabbi Lookstein became the congregation's senior rabbi following the death of Rabbi Margolies.

Rabbi Joseph Lookstein founded the Ramaz School in 1937, which was named in honor of Rabbi Margolies, known by the acronym of "Rabbi Moshe Zevulun." Lookstein's son, (the future Rabbi) Haskel Lookstein, was a member of the school's inaugural class of six students. The Ramaz School had an enrollment of approximately 750 students in 1990, which had grown to 1,100 students in elementary through high school by 2007.

References

1851 births
1936 deaths
American Orthodox rabbis
Deaths from pneumonia in New Jersey
Emigrants from the Russian Empire to the United States
People from Manhattan